Osmer Eduardo Morales (born October 30, 1992) is a Venezuelan professional baseball pitcher who is a free agent. He previously played in Major League Baseball (MLB) for the Los Angeles Angels.

Career

Seattle Mariners
Morales signed a minor league deal with the Seattle Mariners on May 1, 2010, beginning his professional career. Osmer played in the minor leagues with the Mariners through the 2016 season. He elected free agency on November 7, 2016.

Los Angeles Angels
On November 14, 2016, Morales signed a minor league deal with the Los Angeles Angels. Morales spent the 2017 season with the Mobile BayBears, Inland Empire 66ers, and Salt Lake Bees. Morales was invited to Spring Training for the 2018 season. He failed to make the majors and was reassigned to Salt Lake.  Morales was called up to the majors for the first time on August 13, 2018. He was designated for assignment by the Angels on September 3, 2018. He elected free agency on November 2.

On February 11, 2020, Morales signed with the Cleburne Railroaders of the American Association of Independent Professional Baseball. However, the team was not selected by the league to compete in the condensed 2020 season due to the COVID-19 pandemic. Morales was not chosen by another team in the dispersal draft, and therefore became a free agent.

Bravos de León
On March 10, 2021, Morales signed with the Bravos de León of the Mexican League. Morales recorded a 2–4 record and 7.24 ERA in 7 appearances before being released on June 27.

Algodoneros de Unión Laguna
On June 29, 2021, Morales signed with the Algodoneros de Unión Laguna of the Mexican League. In 6 starts, Morales went 1–3 with a 5.46 ERA and 25 strikeouts. He was released following the season on October 20, 2021.

References

External links
 

1992 births
Living people
Major League Baseball players from Venezuela
Major League Baseball pitchers
Los Angeles Angels players
Venezuelan Summer League Mariners players
Arizona League Mariners players
Cardenales de Lara players
Clinton LumberKings players
Bakersfield Blaze players
Mobile BayBears players
Salt Lake Bees players
Bravos de León players
Venezuelan expatriate baseball players in Mexico
Venezuelan expatriate baseball players in the United States
People from Villa de Cura